The men's PTWC triathlon was part of the Triathlon at the 2018 Commonwealth Games program. The competition was held on 7 April 2018 in the Southport Broadwater Parklands.

Schedule
All times are Australian Eastern Standard Time (UTC+10)

Competition format
The race was held over the "sprint distance" and consisted of  swimming,  road bicycling, and  road running. As the event included multiple para-sport classifications, a 'compensation' time system was used, with athletes in more restricted classifications beginning the event a factored time period ahead of other athletes to create fair competition.

Results

References

Triathlon at the 2018 Commonwealth Games